This is a list of notable events in country music that took place in the year 1986.

Events
 January 18 — "American Country Countdown" with Bob Kingsley expands from three to four hours. Several new features — including a chronological playback of songs reaching No. 1 on the Billboard Hot Country Singles chart and a calendar feature  (highlighting a birthday, or anniversary of a notable song or event in country music) — are added.
 June 25 — Jenifer Strait, the 13-year-old daughter of George Strait (who by now is one of country music's top performers) is killed in a car accident in San Marcos, Texas. Her father still refuses to talk about his daughter's death to this day.
 July 19 — Columbia Records drops Johnny Cash from the label's roster after 28 years.

No dates
For the first time in its 42-year history, there is a new No. 1 song for each week of the year, according to Billboard magazine's Hot Country Singles Chart.
1986 was a renaissance year in country music, with a host of "A New Traditionalist"-minded artists reinvigorating a genre that critics were saying had grown increasingly stagnant and pop-oriented. Among the most successful new artists: Holly Dunn, Judy Rodman, Ricky Van Shelton, Randy Travis and Dwight Yoakam. Keith Whitley, another artist who had been around for a few years, has his first major hit early in the year. They – along with popular newcomers from earlier in the decade such as Alabama, George Strait and Reba McEntire, and longtime artists like George Jones, Merle Haggard and Conway Twitty – proved not only that country music was the music of the people, but also that the genre had real resiliency.
After 17 years of playing co-host to Roy Clark, Buck Owens announces his departure from the still-popular "Hee Haw." Clark would soldier on alone for the next six years, with rotating guest stars each week.

Top hits of the year

Singles released by American artists

Singles released by Canadian artists

Top new album releases

Other top albums

On television

Regular series
 Hee Haw (1969–1993, syndicated)

Specials

Births
 February 2 — Blaine Larsen, 2000's (decade) singer better known for his single "How Do You Get That Lonely".
 March 23 — Brett Eldredge, singer of the 2010s best known for hits including "Don't Ya" and "Beat of the Music".
 April 1 — Hillary Scott, member of Lady Antebellum and daughter of Linda Davis.
 April 2 — Chris Janson, singer-songwriter known for his 2015 hit "Buy Me a Boat".
 June 18 — Jimmie Allen, singer-songwriter known for his late 2010s hits "Best Shot" and "Make Me Want To".
 June 28 — Kellie Pickler, sixth-place finalist on the fifth season of American Idol.
 August 16 — Ashton Shepherd, debuted in late 2007-early 2008 with her top 20 single "Takin' Off This Pain".
 September 10 — Ashley Monroe, singer-songwriter of the 2000s and 2010s and member of the Pistol Annies.
 September 19 — Chase Rice, singer of the 2010s best known for the hit "Ready Set Roll."

Deaths
 February 10 — Arthur E. Satherley, 96, music executive.
 May 30 — "Papa Joe" Brown, 60, founding member of Canadian country group Family Brown.
 June 20 — Whitey Ford, 85, beloved Grand Ole Opry comedian and storyteller.
 June 25 — Jenifer Strait, 13, daughter of George Strait (car accident).
 June 27 — Joe Maphis, 65, prolific guitarist and fiddler, prominently featured on the theme to "Bonanza" (cancer).
 December 5 — Carmol Taylor, 53, songwriter.

Hall of Fame inductees

Country Music Hall of Fame inductees
Duke of Paducah (1901–1986)
Wesley Rose (1918–1990)

Canadian Country Music Hall of Fame inductees
Papa Joe Brown

Major awards

Grammy Awards
Best Female Country Vocal Performance — "Whoever's in New England", Reba McEntire
Best Male Country Vocal Performance — "Lost in the Fifties Tonight", Ronnie Milsap
Best Country Performance by a Duo or Group with Vocal — "Grandpa (Tell Me 'Bout the Good Ol' Days)". The Judds
Best Country Instrumental Performance — "Raisin' the Dickins", Ricky Skaggs
Best Country Song — "Grandpa (Tell Me 'Bout the Good Old Days)", Jamie O'Hara (Performer: The Judds)

Juno Awards
Country Male Vocalist of the Year — Murray McLauchlan
Country Female Vocalist of the Year — Anne Murray
Country Group or Duo of the Year — Prairie Oyster

Academy of Country Music
Entertainer of the Year — Hank Williams, Jr.
Song of the Year — "On the Other Hand", Paul Overstreet and Don Schlitz (Performer: Randy Travis)
Single of the Year — "On the Other Hand", Randy Travis
Album of the Year — Storms of Life, Randy Travis
Top Male Vocalist — Randy Travis
Top Female Vocalist — Reba McEntire
Top Vocal Duo — The Judds
Top Vocal Group — The Forester Sisters
Top New Male Vocalist — Dwight Yoakam
Top New Female Vocalist — Holly Dunn
Video of the Year — "Whoever's in New England", Reba McEntire (Directors: Jeff Schock and Jon Small)

Canadian Country Music Association
Entertainer(s) of the Year — Family Brown
Male Artist of the Year — Terry Carisse
Female Artist of the Year — Anita Perras
Group of the Year — Family Brown
SOCAN Song of the Year — "Now and Forever", David Foster, Jim Vallance, Charles Randolph Goodrum (Performer: Anne Murray)
Single of the Year — "Now and Forever," Anne Murray
Album of the Year — Feel the Fire, Family Brown
Top Selling Album — Hymns of Gold, Carroll Baker
Vista Rising Star Award — J. K. Gulley
Duo of the Year — Anita Perras and Tim Taylor

Country Music Association
Entertainer of the Year — Reba McEntire
Song of the Year — "On the Other Hand", Paul Overstreet and Don Schlitz (Performer: Randy Travis)
Single of the Year — "Bop", Dan Seals
Album of the Year — Lost in the Fifties Tonight, Ronnie Milsap
Male Vocalist of the Year — George Strait
Female Vocalist of the Year — Reba McEntire
Vocal Duo of the Year — Marie Osmond and Dan Seals
Vocal Group of the Year — The Judds
Horizon Award — Randy Travis
Music Video of the Year — "Who's Gonna Fill Their Shoes?", George Jones (Director: Marc Ball)
Instrumentalist of the Year — Johnny Gimble
Instrumental Group of the Year — The Oak Ridge Boys

Further reading
Kingsbury, Paul, "The Grand Ole Opry: History of Country Music. 70 Years of the Songs, the Stars and the Stories," Villard Books, Random House; Opryland USA, 1995
Kingsbury, Paul, "Vinyl Hayride: Country Music Album Covers 1947–1989," Country Music Foundation, 2003
Millard, Bob, "Country Music: 70 Years of America's Favorite Music," HarperCollins, New York, 1993
Whitburn, Joel, "Top Country Songs 1944–2005 – 6th Edition." 2005.

Other links
Country Music Association
Inductees of the Country Music Hall of Fame

References

External links
Country Music Hall of Fame

Country
Country music by year